The following is a timeline of the history of the city of Rennes, France.

Before the 20th century

 5th C. CE – Roman Catholic diocese of Rennes active.
 1356 – Siege of Rennes (1356-1357).
 1561 – Parlement of Brittany headquartered in Rennes.
 1589 – 13 March: Philippe Emmanuel, Duke of Mercœur takes power.
 1598 – May: Entry of Henry IV into Rennes.
 1654 –  built.
 1672 – Saint George Palace built.
 1693 – Office of mayor established.
 1700 –  built.
 1720 – December: .
 1743 – Rennes City Hall built.
 1757 –  founded.
 1768 –  built.
 1770 – Population: 23,143.
 1790 – Rennes becomes part of the Ille-et-Vilaine souveraineté.
 1793 – Population: 30,160.
 1794 – Museum of Fine Arts of Rennes and  established.
 1803
 Municipal library founded.(fr)
  opens.
 1836 –  opens.
 1853 – Société d'horticulture d'Ille-et-Vilaine founded.
 1856 – Population: 45,664.
 1857 – Gare de Rennes built.
 1858 –  founded.
 1878 – Centre pénitentiaire de Rennes women's prison begins operating.
 1882 – Société de géographie de Rennes founded.
 1886 – Population: 66,139.
 1899 – Alfred Dreyfus' second trial takes place in Rennes.

20th century

 1903 –  built.
 1911 – Population: 79,372.
 1933 – Rennes–Saint-Jacques Airport built.
 1936 –  built.
 1940
 German occupation begins.(fr)
 September: Frontstalag 127 prisoner-of-war camp for Allied POWs established by the Germans.
 October: Frontstalag 133 POW camp established by the Germans.
 1944 – 4 August: Liberation of Rennes by Allied forces.
 1946 – Population: 113,781.
 1956 – Rennes partnered with Exeter, UK.
 1958 – Rennes partnered with Rochester, New York, USA.
 1962 – Population: 151,948.
 1964 – Rennes partnered with Erlangen, Germany.
 1965 – Rennes partnered with Brno, Czech Republic.
 1967 – Rennes partnered with Sendai, Japan.
 1968 – Rennes "Maison de la Culture" established.
 1970 – University of Rennes 1 established.
 1977 – Edmond Hervé becomes mayor.
 1980 – Rennes partnered with Leuven, Belgium.
 1982
 Rennes partnered with Setif, Algeria; and Cork, Ireland.
 Rennes becomes part of the Brittany (administrative region).
 1983 – Regional Council of Brittany headquartered in the Hôtel de Courcy in Rennes.(fr)
 1989 –  in use.
 1990
 Socialist Party national congress held in Rennes.
 Théâtre National de Bretagne established.
 1991 – Rennes partnered with Almaty, Kazakhstan.
 1992
 Gare de Rennes rebuilt.
 Rennes partnered with Hué, Vietnam.
 1994 – February: .
 1995 – Rennes partnered with Bandiagara Cercle, Mali.
 1998 – Rennes partnered with Poznań, Poland.
 1999
 Rennes partnered with Sibiu, Romania.
 Population: 206,229.

21st century

 2002
 Rennes Metro begins operating.
 Rennes partnered with Jinan, China.
 2006 – Les Champs Libres cultural centre opens.
 2008
 Pathe Gaumont cinema opens.
 Daniel Delaveau becomes mayor.
 2012 – Population: 209,860.
 2014
 March:  held.
 Nathalie Appéré becomes mayor.
 2015 – December:  held.

See also
 History of Rennes
 
 
  department
 

other cities in the Brittany region
 Timeline of Brest, France

References

This article incorporates information from the French Wikipedia.

Bibliography

In English

In French
  (includes timeline)

External links

 Items related to Rennes, various dates (via Europeana).
 Items related to Rennes, various dates (via Digital Public Library of America).

rennes
Rennes
rennes